This is the list of Pan American medalists in football.

Men's tournament

Women's tournament

References

Football
Medalists